Waleran de Beaumont may refer to:

Waleran de Beaumont, Earl of Worcester (1104–1166)
Galeran V de Beaumont, Count of Meulan (died 1191)
Waleran de Beaumont, 4th Earl of Warwick (1153–1204)

See also
House of Beaumont